Hunter is a town in Sawyer County, Wisconsin, United States. The population was 765 at the 2000 census. The census-designated place of New Post is located in the town.

Geography
According to the United States Census Bureau, the town has a total area of 76.0 square miles (196.8 km2), of which, 52.1 square miles (135.0 km2) of it is land and 23.9 square miles (61.8 km2) of it (31.39%) is water.

Demographics
As of the census of 2000, there were 765 people, 334 households, and 231 families residing in the town. The population density was 14.7 people per square mile (5.7/km2). There were 887 housing units at an average density of 17.0 per square mile (6.6/km2). The racial makeup of the town was 62.75% White, 35.82% Native American, and 1.44% from two or more races. Hispanic or Latino of any race were 1.05% of the population.

There were 334 households, out of which 21.0% had children under the age of 18 living with them, 50.6% were married couples living together, 12.3% had a female householder with no husband present, and 30.8% were non-families. 25.1% of all households were made up of individuals, and 6.9% had someone living alone who was 65 years of age or older. The average household size was 2.29 and the average family size was 2.68.

In the town, the population was spread out, with 20.9% under the age of 18, 5.5% from 18 to 24, 24.2% from 25 to 44, 31.5% from 45 to 64, and 17.9% who were 65 years of age or older. The median age was 45 years. For every 100 females, there were 104.5 males. For every 100 females age 18 and over, there were 109.3 males.

The median income for a household in the town was $30,208, and the median income for a family was $29,702. Males had a median income of $24,821 versus $20,486 for females. The per capita income for the town was $16,309. About 13.0% of families and 14.9% of the population were below the poverty line, including 23.4% of those under age 18 and 6.6% of those age 65 or over.

References

Towns in Sawyer County, Wisconsin
Towns in Wisconsin